Tyresö HF is a Swedish women's handball club from Tyresö established in 1990, currently competing in the second-tier Allsvenskan. In 1986 it reached the IHF Cup's semifinals, and between 1987 and 1989 it won three national championships in a row. The team was relegated in 1995; it returned to the Elitserien in 2010, but it lost all 22 games and was again relegated.

Kits

Titles
 Elitserien
 1987, 1988, 1989

References

External links
  
 

Swedish handball clubs
Sport in Stockholm County